Childress is an unincorporated community in Montgomery County, Virginia, United States.

History
Childress contained a post office from 1852 until 1952. The original name of the post office, Childress Store, honors three brothers named Childress who kept a store in the community.

The Bowyer-Trollinger Farm, Cromer House, and Thomas Hall House are listed on the National Register of Historic Places.

References

Unincorporated communities in Montgomery County, Virginia
Unincorporated communities in Virginia